Rex McGill (born 17 March 1949) is a New Zealand cricketer. He played in five first-class matches for Northern Districts from 1969 to 1972.

See also
 List of Northern Districts representative cricketers

References

External links
 

1949 births
Living people
New Zealand cricketers
Northern Districts cricketers
People from Te Awamutu
Cricketers from Waikato